Elokuutio is the seventh studio album by Finnish progressive metal band Stam1na. It was produced by Janne Joutsenniemi and mixed by Jens Bogren. The album's title Elokuutio can mean eloquence, but can also be translated as "living cube". Lyricist Antti Hyyrynen describes the album's theme as the "digital hell of the unreligious".

On January 8, 2016, the track listing and cover art of the album was revealed. On February 19, the first single from the album, "Kuudet raamit", was released, and a week later a 360 music video directed by Tuomas Petsalo was released.

Track listing
"Ikoneklasmia" – "Iconoclasm/iGadgetclasm" – 6:23
"Elokuutio" – "Eloquence/Living Cube" – 4:07
"Meidänkaltaisillemme" – "To Our Kind/Like Us" – 3:29
"Pala palalta" – "Piece by Piece" – 4:44
"Pienet vihreät miehet" – "Little Green Men" – 3:46
"Mätä hohtava omena" – "Rotten Glowing Apple" – 4:10
"D.S.M." – "Deus Sex Machina" – 4:37
"Marttyyri" – "Martyr" – 6:27
"Kuudet raamit" – "Six Frames" – 3:32
"Valhe" – "Lie" – 6:37

Personnel

Stam1na
 Antti Hyyrynen – vocals, guitar
 Kai-Pekka Kangasmäki – bass guitar, backing vocals
 Emil Lähteenmäki – keyboards
 Pekka Olkkonen – lead guitar
 Teppo Velin – drums

Guest musicians
 Tomi Joutsen – vocals on "Meidänkaltaisillemme"
 Kalle Lindberg – vocals on "D.S.M."
 Tuomo Saikkonen – backing vocals on "Meidänkaltaisillemme" and "Marttyyri"
 Janne Joutsenniemi – backing vocals on "Marttyyri" and "Kuudet raamit"

Charts

References

External links
 "Kuudet raamit" music video on YouTube

Stam1na albums
2016 albums